KBEN may refer to:

 KBEN (AM), a radio station (1450 AM) licensed to Carrizo Springs, Texas, United States
 KBEN-FM, a radio station (103.3 FM) licensed to Cowley, Wyoming, United States